Boes is a surname. Notable people with the surname include:

Helge Boes (1970–2003), American intelligence officer
Jules Boes (1927–2016), Belgian basketball player 
Mirja Boes (born 1971), German comedian, actress, and singer

See also
Boe (surname)
Boss (surname)